Capriano del Colle is a comune in the  province of Brescia, Lombardy, northern Italy.  It is bounded by other communes of Azzano Mella, Bagnolo Mella, Flero, Poncarale, Castel Mella and Dello. It is situated on the eastern slopes of Monte Netto, famous for the production of Clinto grapes.

References

Cities and towns in Lombardy